In enzymology, an anthranilate—CoA ligase is an enzyme that catalyzes the chemical reaction

ATP + anthranilate + CoA  AMP + diphosphate + anthranilyl-CoA

The 3 substrates of this enzyme are ATP, anthranilate, and CoA, whereas its 3 products are AMP, diphosphate, and anthranilyl-CoA.

This enzyme belongs to the family of ligases, specifically those forming carbon-sulfur bonds as acid-thiol ligases.  The systematic name of this enzyme class is anthranilate:CoA ligase (AMP-forming). Other names in common use include anthraniloyl coenzyme A synthetase, 2-aminobenzoate-CoA ligase, 2-aminobenzoate-coenzyme A ligase, and 2-aminobenzoate coenzyme A ligase.  This enzyme participates in 3 metabolic pathways: carbazole degradation, benzoate degradation via coa ligation, and acridone alkaloid biosynthesis.

References

 

EC 6.2.1
Enzymes of unknown structure
Anthranilates